The 1950 Dartmouth Indians football team was an American football team that represented Dartmouth College as an independent during the 1950 college football season. In their eighth season under head coach Tuss McLaughry, the Indians compiled a 3–5–1 record, and were outscored 157 to 123 by their opponents. Paul Staley was the team captain.

Dartmouth played its home games at Memorial Field on the college campus in Hanover, New Hampshire.

Schedule

References

Dartmouth
Dartmouth Big Green football seasons
Dartmouth Indians football